Yemm is an English surname derived from an old word for uncle in its dialectal form from the Forest of Dean.

Notable people with the surname include:

Jodie Yemm, Australian actress, best known for her roles in television soap operas
Louis W. Yemm (died 1951), British-born organist in South Australia, associated with Cheer-Up Society and Violet Memory Day
Norman Yemm (1933–2015), Australian actor, athlete and footballer, played Norm Baker in the television drama The Sullivans
Richard Yemm, British inventor of the Pelamis Wave Energy Converter and CTO of Pelamis Wave Power
Rick Yemm, Season 1 driver on American TV series Ice Road Truckers

See also
Yamm (disambiguation)
YEM (disambiguation)
YMM (disambiguation)

Footnotes